Unconditional love is known as affection without any limitations, or love without conditions. This term is sometimes associated with other terms such as true altruism or complete love. Each area of expertise has a certain way of describing unconditional love, but most will agree that it is that type of love which has no bounds and is unchanging. 

In Christianity, unconditional love is thought to be part of the Four Loves; affection, friendship, eros, and charity. In ethology, or the study of animal behavior, unconditional love would refer to altruism, which in turn refers to the behavior by individuals that increases the fitness of another while decreasing the fitness of the individual committing the act. In psychology, unconditional love refers to a state of mind in which one has the goal of increasing the welfare of another, despite the lack of any evidence of benefit for oneself.

Conditional love 

Some authors make a distinction between unconditional love and conditional love. In conditional love, love is "earned" on the basis of conscious or unconscious conditions being met by the lover, whereas in unconditional love, love is "given freely" to the loved one "no matter what". Loving is primary. Conditional love requires some kind of finite exchange, whereas unconditional love is seen as infinite and measureless. 

Unconditional love should not be confused with unconditional dedication: unconditional dedication or "duty" refers to an act of the will irrespective of feelings (e.g. a person may consider that they have a duty to stay with someone); unconditional love is an act of the feelings irrespective of will.

Unconditional love separates the individual from their behavior. However, the individual may exhibit behaviors that are unacceptable in a particular situation.

Humanistic psychology 
Humanistic psychologist Carl Rogers spoke of an unconditional positive regard and dedication towards one single support. Rogers stated that the individual needed an environment that provided them with genuineness, authenticity, openness, self-disclosure, acceptance, empathy, and approval. Rogers proposed this idea of Unconditional Positive Regard not only in social and familial situations, but also encouraged getting the healthy loving environment in therapy situations as well. It is important that in face-to-face therapy settings this environment is fostered along with empathy and understanding for the individual. It is through unconditional positive regard that change happens because the individual can feel that openness, love, and ability to be themselves again which fosters a true desire to change for the right reasons.  

Also, Abraham Maslow supported the unconditional love perspective by saying that in order to grow, an individual had to have a positive perspective of themselves. In Man's Search For Meaning, logotherapist and Holocaust survivor Viktor Frankl draws parallels between the human capacity to love unconditionally and living a meaningful life. Frankl writes: "Love is the only way to grasp another human being in the innermost core of his personality. No one can become fully aware of the essence of another human being unless he loves him. ... Furthermore, by his love, the loving person enables the beloved person to actualize ... potentialities." For Frankl, unconditional love is a means by which we enable and reach human potential.

Neurological basis 

There has been some evidence to support a neural basis for unconditional love, showing that it stands apart from other types of love.

In a study conducted by Mario Beauregard and his colleagues, using an fMRI procedure, they studied the brain imaging of participants who were shown different sets of images either referring to "maternal love" (unconditional love) or "romantic love". Seven areas of the brain became active when these participants called to mind feelings of unconditional love. Three of these were similar to areas that became active when it came to romantic love. The other four active parts activated during the unconditional love portions of the experiment were different, showing certain brain regions associated with rewarding aspects, pleasurable (non-sexual) feelings, and human maternal behaviors. Through the associations made between the different regions, results show that the feeling of love for someone without the need of being rewarded is different from the feeling of romantic love.

Along with the idea of "mother love", which is commonly associated with unconditional love, a study found patterns in the neuroendocrine system and motivation-affective neural system. Using the fMRI procedure, mothers watched a video of themselves playing with their children in a familiar environment, like home. The procedure found part of the amygdala and nucleus accumbens were responsive on levels of emotion and empathy. Emotion and empathy (compassion) are descriptives of love, therefore it supports the idea that the neural occurrences are evidence of unconditional love.

Religious perspective

Christianity 

In Christianity, the term "unconditional love" can be used to indicate God's love for a person irrespective of that person. This comes from the concept of God sending His only Son, Jesus Christ down from heaven to earth to die on a cross in order to take the punishment for all of humanity's sins. If someone chooses to believe in this, commonly called "The Gospel", then Jesus' price on the cross pays for their sins so they can freely enter into heaven, and not hell. The term is not explicitly used in the Bible, and advocates for God's conditional or unconditional love, using different passages or interpretations to support their point of view, are both encountered due to the different facets of God's nature. The cross is a clear indicator of God's unconditional love in that there is no way to earn one's way to heaven, one must simply believe. In all other religions cited below, there is a conditional striving to achieve a sense of unconditional love, based on one's own efforts and understanding. In Christianity, it all depends on Jesus, not the person's effort nor understanding. A passage in scriptures cites this "For it is by grace you have been saved, through faith—and this is not from yourselves, it is the gift of God—" Ephesians 2:8,9, NIV. God's discipline can be viewed as conditional based on people's choices, but His actual love through Jesus is unconditional, and this is where some may become confused. His salvation is a free gift, but His discipline, which is shaping of good character, can look more conditional. Ultimately, knowing God and free passage to heaven have already been supplied by a God of unconditional love, one can simply choose to believe in order to receive such love. The civil rights leader and Pastor, Dr. Martin Luther King Jr. was quoted as saying "I believe that unarmed truth and unconditional love will have the final word in reality".

Buddhism 

In Buddhism one of the most important concepts is called "bodhicitta". There are two kinds of Bodhicitta.  They are relative and absolute bodhicitta.

In relative bodhicitta, one learns about the desire to gain the understanding of unconditional love, which in Buddhism is expressed as loving-kindness and compassion. The point is to develop bodhicitta for all living (sentient) beings.  

Absolute bodhicitta is a more esoteric tantric teaching. Understanding the principle of loving-kindness and compassion is expressed when one treats all living beings as if one was or had been (in former lives) their own mother.  One's mother will do anything for the benefit of her child. The most loving of all relationships may be that between a mother and her child. Of course, if all beings treated all other living beings as they would their own child, then there would be much less enmity in this world.  

The importance of this cannot be overstated. At every moment one has the opportunity to make a choice how to act, and to be completely mindful of one's actions means that in every interaction with another being one will consciously act with loving-kindness and compassion toward every other being, no matter what the nature of that interaction.

Hinduism 
Hinduism and Buddhism, the Sanskrit word "bhakti" is apparently used by some to refer to unconditional love, even though its root meaning seems to be "participate". Bhakti or bhakthi is unconditional religious devotion of a devotee in worship of a divine.

Islam
In Islamic belief, unconditional love can only be directed to Allah. The highest spiritual attainment in Islam is related to the love of God. "Yet there are men who take (for worship) others besides God, as equal (with God): They love them as they should love God. But those of Faith are overflowing in their love for God."
O lovers! The religion of the love of God is not found in Islam alone.

In the realm of love, there is neither belief, nor unbelief.

In Islamic Sufism, unconditional love is the basis for the divine love Ishq-e-Haqeeqi, elaborated by many great Muslim saints to date. Prominent mystics explain the concept in its entirety and describe its hardcore reality.

Rabia of Basra was the one who first set forth the doctrine of divine love known as ishq-e-haqeeqi and is widely considered to be the most important of the early renunciants, one mode of piety that would eventually become labeled as Sufism.

She prayed:
O Lord, if I worship You because of Fear of Hell,
then burn me in Hell;

If I worship You because I desire Paradise,
then exclude me from Paradise;

But if I worship You for Yourself alone,
then deny me not your Eternal Beauty.

Ishq itself means to love God selflessly and unconditionally. For Rumi, "Sufism" itself is Ishq and not the path of asceticism (zuhd). According to Sultan Bahoo, Ishq means to serve God unconditionally by devoting one's entire life to Him and asking no reward in return.

Other religions 
Neopaganism in general, and Wicca in particular, commonly use a traditional inspirational text Charge of the Goddess, which affirms that the Goddess's "law is love unto all beings". 

Mohism, China around 500 BCE, bases its entire premise on the supremacy of such an element, comparing one's duty to the indiscriminate generosity of "The Sky", or "Heaven", in contrast to Confucianism, which based its model of society on family love and duty. Later schools engaged in much debate on exactly how unconditional one could be in actual society (cf. "...who is my neighbour?" in "The Good Samaritan" story of Jesus of Nazareth).

Unitarian Universalism, though not having a set religious creed or doctrine, generally accepts the belief that all human beings are worthy and in need of unconditional love though charity in the community and spiritual understanding. The Unitarian Universalist Association explicitly argues this in the Seven Principles, where the "inherent worth and dignity" of all humans is a regularly cited source arguing for unconditional love.

References

Further reading
 Kramer, J. and Alstead D., The Guru Papers: Masks of Authoritarian Power, 1993, 
 Schnarch, David, Passionate Marriage: Keeping Love and Intimacy Alive in Committed Relationships, 1998, 
 Schnarch, David, Constructing the Sexual Crucible; An Integration of Sexual and Marital Therapy,
 Schnarch, David, Resurrecting Sex: Resolving Sexual Problems and Revolutionizing Your Relationship.
 Stendhal, On Love: The Classic Analysis of Romantic Love
 Tennov, Dorothy, Love and Limerence: The Experience of Being in Love, 1999

Love